Schulzia may refer to:
 Schulzia (nematode), a genus of nematodes in the family Molineidae
 Schulzia (plant), a genus of plants in the family Apiaceae